Michael D. Fox is an American neurologist at Harvard Medical School in Boston, Massachusetts where he holds the  Raymond D. Adams Distinguished Chair in Neurology and directs the Center for Brain Circuit Therapeutics at Brigham and Women's Hospital. His research has focused on resting state brain fMRI which uses spontaneous fluctuations in blood oxygenation to map brain networks including the default mode network. He developed the technique lesion network mapping to study the connectivity patterns of brain lesions to help understand the neuroanatomy of a diverse range of processes including addiction, criminality, blindsight, free will and religiosity. Michael D. Fox has been considered among the "World's Most Influential Scientific Minds" by Thomson Reuters since 2014.

References

External links
Official site

Harvard Medical School faculty
American neurologists
Living people
Physicians from Ohio
Year of birth missing (living people)